Probable palmitoyltransferase ZDHHC4 is an enzyme that in humans is encoded by the ZDHHC4 gene.

See also
 Chromosome 7 (human)
 Cytochrome c oxidase 
 DHHC domain

References

Further reading